The Washington Utilities and Transportation Commission (UTC) is a three-member board appointed by the Governor of Washington and confirmed by the Washington State Senate to six-year terms.  The purpose of the UTC is to regulate the rates, services, and practices of privately owned utilities and transportation companies, including electric, telecommunications, natural gas, water, and solid waste collection companies, pipelines, commercial ferries, buses, and motor carriers.  The UTC is based in Olympia, Washington and employs approximately 150 staff, including attorneys, economists, accountants, and engineers.  The agency is primarily an economic regulator; however, the UTC also houses Washington's pipeline safety program which inspects interstate and intrastate hazardous liquid and natural gas pipeline operators as an agent for the federal Pipeline and Hazardous Materials Safety Administration.

See also
 Public Utilities Commission

External links 
 Washington utilities and Transportation Commission website

Utilities and Transportation Commission
Washington State